Robinson Crusoe Airport ,  is an airport serving Robinson Crusoe Island, a Pacific island  off the coast of Chile.

See also

Transport in Chile
List of airports in Chile

References

External links
 OpenStreetMap – Isla Robinson Crusoe
 OurAirports – Isla Robinson Crusoe
 SkyVector – Isla Robinson Crusoe
 
 

Airports in Chile
Airports in Valparaíso Region